(+)-Menthofuran synthase (menthofuran synthase, (+)-pulegone 9-hydroxylase, (+)-MFS, cytochrome P450 menthofuran synthase) is an enzyme with systematic name (+)-pulegone,NADPH:oxygen oxidoreductase (9-hydroxylating). This enzyme catalyses the following chemical reaction

 (+)-pulegone + NADPH + H+ + O2  (+)-menthofuran + NADP+ + H2O

Menthofuran synthase is a heme-thiolate protein (P-450).

References

External links 
 

EC 1.14.13